Epidemia (sometimes referred to as 'Epi' by fans) is a Russian power metal band famous for doing the Elven Manuscript metal opera in 2004. It was formed by guitarist Yuri "Juron" Melisov in 1993, with the first songs made in 1995.   The band was once nominated for an MTV Europe Music Award.

History

In 1993, the as-yet unnamed group recorded the demo album Phoenix, with Melisov performing both guitars and vocals. Melisov came up with the name "Epidemia" (Russian for epidemic) in 1995. Vocalist Pavel Okunev and guitarist-songwriter Roman Zakharov joined Epidemia to record the debut studio release Volya k Zhizni (Will to Live) a lo-fi EP with five tracks.  The follow-up, Na Krayu Vremeni (At the Edge of Time) was the band's first full-length CD. It was recorded by the line-up of Yuri Melisov (guitar), Roman Zakharov (guitar), Pavel Okunev (vocals), Ilya Knyazev (bass) and Andrey Laptev (drums).

In 2000, Maxim Samosvat, who was a member of Mechanical Poet, replaced Okunev on vocals. Epidemia's first release with the new vocalist was Zagadka Volshebnoy Strani (Riddle of the Wonderland). A video was shot for the ballad "Ya Molilsya na Tebya" (I was Praising You) and aired on MTV Russia. Epidemia was nominated for an MTV Europe Music Award in 2002. New line-up changes came after Roman Zakharov (the band's second composer) departed, and Andrey Laptev left the band.

With the new line-up, Melisov decided to complete a conceptual metal opera. Originally, he had planned to create music for the Dragonlance series of fantasy novels, but Epidemia was unable to get rights. Melisov instead wrote his own storyline for the opera, which was similar to the Dragonlance series. In 2004 the conceptual album Elfiyskaya Rukopis (Elven Manuscript), featuring vocalists from Aria, Arida Vortex, Chorny Obelisk and Master, was released. The album was produced by Vladimir Holstinin of Aria fame. Epidemia's presentation of Elven Manuscript together with Aria on February 13, 2004 at the Friday 13 Festival was attended by around 6,000 people. The popularity of the band grew, and the track "Proydi Svoy Put" (Pass Your Way) from the opera held the top position on the Nashe Radio weekly chart for one month.

A year later, Epidemia released the Livin' in Twilight album, consisting of re-recorded songs from their first three albums. Livin' in Twilight was recorded with Ilya "Lars" Mamontov playing second guitar instead of Bushuyev. In fall 2006, Epidemia released a double DVD set, consisting of 10 Years' Path, a live recording of material from their first three albums, and The Elven Manuscript, a recording of songs solely from the Elven Manuscript album. In 2007, Epidemia released a follow-up to Elven Manuscript, entitled The Elven Manuscript: Legend of All Times. It continued along the same storyline set in the first metal opera, and was Epidemia's first full-length featuring Ivan Izotov on bass.

A theatrical performance of both parts of Elven Manuscript took place in the Luzhniki Sports Arena on December 3, 2007, and drew 5000 fans. After the 2007 release and show, Epidemia received many offers to play in different Russian cities and CIS countries (Ukraine, Latvia, Armenia).  In April 2008, Epidemia held "The Unusual Concert", where all the musicians played on unusual acoustic instruments.

Discography

Members

Current members
Yury Melisov - guitars (1993–present), vocals (1993-1996)
Dmitry Krivenkov - drums (2003–present)
Ilya Mamontov - guitars (2005-2010), bass (2011-present)
Dmitry Protsko - guitars (2011–present)
Evgeny Egorov - vocals (2011–present)

Past members
Dmitry Shcherbakov - bass (1993-1995)
Mikhail Yeltsov - drums (1993-1995)
Aram Oganesyan - guitars (1993-1994)
Artem Smirnov - bass (1995-1996)
Andrey Laptev - drums (1995-2002)
Andrey Manko - guitars (1995-1997)
Nikolay Turunov - bass (1996-1998)
Pavel Okunev - vocals (1996-2000)
Roman Zakharov	- guitars (1997-2001)
Ilya Knyazev - bass (1998-2005)
Ekaterina Usanova - keyboards (1999)
Ekaterina Gladkova - keyboards (1999)
Oleg Pokhvalin - keyboards (2000-2001)
Maxim Samosvat	- vocals (2000-2010)
Pavel Bushuyev	- guitars (2001-2004)
Roman Valeryev	- keyboards (2001-2005)
Evgeny Laykov - drums (2002-2003)
Ivan Izotov - bass (2005-2010)
Dmitry Ivanov - keyboards (2005-2015)

Timeline

References

External links 
 (in both Russian and English)
 Epidemia MySpace

Musical groups from Moscow
Russian power metal musical groups
Musical groups established in 1995